Aniket is an Indian masculine given name. The meaning of the name Aniket is: "one who makes the world his home", Lord of the world; a Celestial, Lord Vishnu or Krishna, Lord Shiva, in other words, the whole world is his home, and not any particular location. 

Notable people with the given name include:

Aniket Chattopadhyay (born 1963), Indian journalist and film director 
Aniket Choudhary (born 1990), Indian cricketer
Aniket Parikh (born 1997), New Zealand cricketer
Aniket Vishwasrao (born 1981), Indian actor
Aniket Tatkare, Indian politician
Aniket Jadhav (born 2000), Indian professional footballer

See also

 Anicet
 Anicetus
 Ankit

References 

Indian masculine given names